Fredericksburg Township is one of twelve townships in Chickasaw County, Iowa, USA.  As of the 2000 census, its population was 982.

History
Fredericksburg Township was organized in 1857. It is named for Frederick Padden, an early settler.

Geography
According to the USGS, it contains two cemeteries: Maple Grove and Rose Hill.

Transportation
Fredericksburg Township contains one airport or landing strip, Klotz Landing Field.

Notes

References
 USGS Geographic Names Information System (GNIS)

External links
 US-Counties.com
 City-Data.com

Townships in Chickasaw County, Iowa
Townships in Iowa
1857 establishments in Iowa
Populated places established in 1857